Milford High School or Milford School is a 1A high school located in Milford, Texas (USA). It is part of the Milford Independent School District located in the southwest corner of Ellis County.  In 2011, the school was rated "Recognized" by the Texas Education Agency.

Athletics
The Milford Bulldogs compete in the following sports:

6-Man Football, Baseball, Basketball, Volleyball, Powerlifting & Track

State Titles
Football - 
1979(6M), 1980(6M)

State Finalists
Football –
1994(6M), 1995(6M), 2013(6M), 2018(6M)

See also

List of high schools in Texas
List of Six-man football stadiums in Texas

References

External links
Milford ISD

Schools in Ellis County, Texas
Public high schools in Texas